Bauma railway station is a railway station in the Swiss canton of Zürich and municipality of Bauma. The station is situated at the junction of the Tösstal railway line, which is still in full use, and the Uerikon to Bauma railway (UeBB), which is partly closed and partly used as a heritage railway.

Bauma station is an intermediate station on the Zürich S-Bahn route S26, which operates between Rapperswil and Winterthur. It is also served by buses of the Verkehrsbetriebe Zürichsee und Oberland (VZO) and Swiss PostBus service (PostAuto). 

Bauma station is also the terminus of the heritage railway services of the Dampfbahn-Verein Zürcher Oberland (DVZO), who operate to Hinwil, over the former UeBB, with trains normally hauled by steam locomotives. The UeBB line beyond Hinwil, towards Uerikon, was closed in 1948 and little now remains.

References

External links 
 
 

Bauma
Bauma